Thuidium delicatulum, also known as the delicate fern moss or common fern moss, is a widespread species of moss in the family Thuidiaceae. It is found in North and South America from Alaska to Brazil.

References

Hypnales
Plants described in 1801